Arcadius may refer to:

 Flavius Arcadius (377-408), Byzantine emperor
 Arcadius of Antioch, Greek grammarian
 Arkadios II, Monothelite archbishop of Cyprus
 Arcadius of Mauretania, 4th-century martyr
 Arcadius of Bourges, bishop and saint
 Arcadius (d. 437), martyr

See also
 Arcadio
 Arkadiusz
 Arkady